Jorhat District Sports Association Ground or  J.D.S.A. Field is a multi-purposed playground located in Jorhat, Assam. The ground was built in 1915 and has capacity of 10,000 spectators. It is a venue for  cricket & football tournaments, fairs & exhibition. In 2008, Jorhat District Sport Association decided to renovate the ground with all the modern facilities like sitting capacity of 25,000 people, construction of a cricket pitch, volleyball court, 400 meters track as well as accommodation building for 100 athletes. The cost of renovation was estimated around 6 crores and was funded by Ministry for Development of North Eastern Region and Jorhat District Administration.

References

External links 

 Cricinfo
 Cricketarchive
 Wikimapia

Cricket grounds in Assam
Football venues in Assam
Multi-purpose stadiums in India
Sports venues in Assam
Jorhat
1915 establishments in India
Sports venues completed in 1915
20th-century architecture in India